The Belfast Media Group's Andersonstown News is a weekly published (Wednesdays) Belfast, Northern Ireland newspaper, which focuses on news and issues in west Belfast. The paper was founded in 1972.

Its stablemates, the North Belfast News and South Belfast News, are published weekly.

According to the Audit Bureau of Circulations, the Andersonstown News has an average circulation of 8,457 for the Monday edition and 16,453 for the Thursday edition

See also
List of newspapers in Ireland

References

External links
Andersonstown News
 

Newspapers published in Northern Ireland
Mass media in Belfast